Choysky District (Çoo aymak) is an administrative and municipal district (raion), one of the ten in the Altai Republic, Russia. It is located in the north of the republic. Its administrative center is the rural locality (a selo) of Choya. As of the 2010 Census, the total population of the district was 8,348, with the population of Choya accounting for 23.0% of that number.

History
The district was established on October 20, 1980.

Administrative and municipal status
Within the framework of administrative divisions, Choysky District is one of the ten in the Altai Republic. As a municipal division, the district is incorporated as Choysky Municipal District. Both administrative and municipal districts are divided into the same seven rural settlements, comprising twenty-one rural localities. The selo of Choya serves as the administrative center of both the administrative and municipal district.

References

Notes

Sources

Districts of the Altai Republic
States and territories established in 1980